This is a list of wars involving the Bolivarian Republic of Venezuela and its predecessor states from 1810 to the present.

See also 
 Venezuela during World War I
 Venezuela during World War II

References

 
Venezuela
Wars